The Concertación de Partidos por la Democracia primaries for the 2012 Chilean municipal elections took place nationally on 1 April 2012. 313,000 people voted in the Concertación primaries in 142 different communes. 142 out of 335 candidates were elected to represent the political conglomerate. 

Following the defeat of the Concertación in the 2009 presidential election, the left-wing parties' primaries were qualified as "defective and restricted." The coalition, then, set the date of the municipal primaries to determine the candidates representing the political conglomerate in the elections of October 2012.

The Concertación primaries were delayed in the commune of Providencia, Santiago Metropolitan Region until 13 May, with three candidates participating. María Josefa Errázuriz was eventually chosen to face current-mayor Cristián Labbé in the October elections.

General results

Results in selected communes 
Region of Arica y Parinacota
Putre

Region of Tarapacá
Colchane

Region of Antofagasta
Antofagasta

Region of Atacama
Copiapó

Region of Coquimbo
Coquimbo

Oscar Pereira died on 6 July 2012. The Christian Democrat Party appointed Cristian Galleguillos as their new candidate.

La Serena

Region of Valparaíso
Valparaiso

Metropolitana de Santiago Region
Maipú

Santiago

La Florida

Providencia
From 13 May

Region of O'Higgins
Rancagua

Pichilemu

Region of the Maule
Talca

Region of the Bío Bío
Hualpén

Region of La Araucanía
Padre Las Casas

Region of Los Ríos
Valdivia

Region of Los Lagos
Puerto Montt

Region of Magallanes y la Antártica Chilena
Punta Arenas

References

External links
 Official website 

Primary elections in Chile
2012 elections in Chile
2012 in Chile
April 2012 events in South America